Teen Jesus and the Jean Teasers are an Australian four-piece rock band from Canberra who formed in 2015. The band consists of Anna Ryan (vocals), Scarlett McKahey (guitar), Neve van Boxsel (drums) and Jaida Stephenson (bass). From 2017 to 2020, the band released four singles including "Desk Chair" which was the first of theirs to receive the attention of Triple J. Their debut extended play, Pretty Good for a Girl Band, was released in 2022 through Domestic La La. The EP's lead single, "AHHHH!", hit number 117 in the Triple J Hottest 200 of 2021, and "Girl Sports" polled at number 55 in the 2022 countdown.

History

2015–2020: Formation and early releases 
The band was formed in 2015 when all four band members were 15 years old. Boxsel had been playing drums since she was 10; Ryan had been singing for all their childhood. The band was formed in Canberra with members also coming from Wollongong and Melbourne.

In June 2019, the band released "I Like That You Like That", and were named as a Triple J Unearthed feature artist. The same year, they performed at Bigsound, Groovin' the Moo and Sydney's Laneway Festival, further touring in the 2019/2020 Falls Festival.

On 6 February 2020, their fourth single "Desk Chair" was released, with Hayden Davies of music publication Pilerats praising it for being "gritty and rough-around-the-edges in the most charming of ways".

2021–present: Pretty Good for a Girl Band 
Upon signing with Domestic La La in 2021, the band's first single with the label, "AHHHH!", was released on 23 July. In the Triple J Hottest 200 of 2021, their song "AHHHH!" made it to number 117 in the countdown. In May 2021, the band performed at a number of festivals in the United Kingdom.

On 3 February 2022, second single "Miss Your Birthday" was released, co-written by Alex Lahey.

On 29 March 2022, the band announced their debut EP Pretty Good for a Girl Band would be released on 13 May. The news was accompanied by the release's third and final single, "Girl Sports", which was described by Ellie Robinson from NME as a "notedly darker cut for the Canberra-native quartet" featuring "more grisly guitar runs, snappy, cymbal-heavy drums and cutthroat lead vocals". The band embarked on a nationwide tour supporting the EP in August 2022.

Artistry 
The band cites the Riot grrrl movement as well as the acts of Cherry Glazerr, Dream Wife, VOIID and WAAX as their biggest influences. Ryan, lead songwriter, has said the intention in their lyricism is "to create music that is relatable and meaningful" to "women especially". The band's lyricism has often alluded to events that have impacted their lives – "Girl Sports" is specifically written about a comment made by Stephenson's male dentist to "stick to girl sports", and their debut EP's name is derived from remarks made by some listeners' surprise at the band's ability.

Band members 

 Anna Ryan – vocals, writing
 Scarlett McKahey – guitar
 Neve van Boxsel – drums
 Jaida Stephenson – bass

Discography

Extended plays

Singles

Notes

References 

Rock music groups
Australian girl groups
All-female punk bands
Australian rock music groups
Australian indie rock groups